"Mono in Love" is a song by Romanian singer Edward Maya. It was released as a single on 2012 and as a digital download EP on 9 July 2013. Unlike Edward's previous singles, "Mono in Love" did not chart.

Track listing 
Digital single
 Mono in Love  – 
 Mono in Love –  

Digital EP
 Mono in Love  – 
 Mono in Love  – 
 Mono in Love  – 
 Mono in Love  – 
 Mono in Love  –  
 Mono in Love –

References 

2012 singles
2012 songs
Edward Maya songs
Ultra Records singles
Progressive house songs
Songs written by Edward Maya